The following is a list of Malayalam films released in the year 1990.

Dubbed films

References

 1990
1990
Malayalam
1990 films
1990 in Indian cinema